İstersen Remixes is the first remix album by Cypriot-Turkish singer Buray. It was released on 30 October 2015 by Sony Music.

Release and content 
Following the high demands for a remix album after the release of his first studio album 1 Şişe Aşk, Buray released remixed versions of the album's lead single, "İstersen", as an album on digital platforms.

The song was written by Gözde Ançel, and composed by Buray together with Ançel. Seven different remixes for "İstersen" were included in the album. DJs Mahmut Orhan, Serhat Karadağ, Soner Babutsa, Sunstroke, Kougan Ray, G.E.M.N.I and Levent Aydın created these altered versions.

Track listing

Charts

Release history

References 

2015 remix albums
Turkish-language albums
Sony Music remix albums